The Somerset Championships was a men's and women's international grass court tennis tournament founded as the West Somerset Archery and Lawn Tennis Tournament in 1881 at  Taunton, Somerset, England. In 1886 it was elevated to a county level event and renamed the Somersetshire Championships. the tournament ran annually until 1984.

History
In 1881 the West Somerset Archery and Lawn Tennis Society established a tennis tournament at Taunton, Somerset, England. In 1886 that event became the Somersetshire Championships. In 1889 the tournament was renamed as the Somerset County Lawn Tennis Championships. The championships were staged annually until 1984. When this tournament was held in Burnham-on-Sea it was held in conjunction with the Burnham-on-Sea Championships.

Location and Venues
The tournament was first held in Taunton at the West Somerset Lawn Tennis Club an associate club of the West Somerset Archery and Lawn Tennis Society, with later editions being held in Burnham-on-Sea at the  Avenue Tennis Club and Weston-super-Mare, Somerset, England.

References

Defunct tennis tournaments in the United Kingdom
Grass court tennis tournaments
Tennis tournaments in England